Thomas Lighton may refer to:

Sir Thomas Lighton, 1st Baronet (died 1805), Ulster Scots banker and politician
Sir Thomas Lighton, 2nd Baronet (1787–1816), of the Lighton baronets
Sir Thomas Lighton, 3rd Baronet (1814–1817), of the Lighton baronets
Sir Thomas Hamilton Lighton, 9th Baronet (born 1954), of the Lighton baronets